The 2020 Mid-American Conference men's basketball tournament was the post-season men's basketball tournament for the Mid-American Conference (MAC). The tournament's first-round games were held on campus sites at the higher seed on March 9. The remaining rounds were to be held at Rocket Mortgage FieldHouse in Cleveland on March 12, 13, and 14, 2020 and the champion was to receive the MAC's automatic bid to the NCAA tournament. Just prior to the scheduled game on March 12 between top-seeded Akron and eighth-seeded Ohio, the conference announced that the remainder of the tournament, and the remainder of the women's tournament, were canceled in response to concerns over the coronavirus pandemic.

Seeds
All 12 MAC teams participated in the tournament. Teams were seeded by record within the conference, with a tiebreaker system to seed teams with identical conference records. The top four teams received a bye to quarterfinals.

Schedule

Bracket

* denotes overtime period

See also
 2020 MAC women's basketball tournament

References

Tournament
2020
Basketball competitions in Cleveland
College sports tournaments in Ohio
2020s in Cleveland
MAC men's basketball tournament
MAC men's basketball tournament
MAC men's basketball tournament